Claudia Payton (born 13 April 1998) is a Swedish sprinter. She represented her country at the 2021 European Indoor Championships finishing eighth in the final.

International competitions

1 Disqualified in the semifinals

Personal bests
Outdoor
100 metres – 11.48 (+2.0 m/s, Skara 2020)
200 metres – 24.65 (+1.6 m/s, Mölndal 2018)
Indoor
60 metres – 7.26 (Toruń 2021)

References

1998 births
Living people
Swedish female sprinters
Swedish people of African-American descent